Aemilia Hilaria (c. 300 – c. 363) was a Gallo-Roman physician. She practiced medicine, and wrote books on gynecology and obstetrics. She was called "Hilaria" due to her cheerfulness as a baby.

Early life

Aemilia was born in the Roman Empire, the area of present Moselle, France. She was the daughter of Caecilius Agricius Arborius and Aemilia Corinthia Maura, both poor nobles from Gaul.

Physician 
She continued to live in the area as an adult and became a physician there. Aemilia was the maternal aunt of Ausonius, a Gallo-Roman senator who became tutor to the Emperor Gratian. Ausonius wrote a series of biographical poems about his family members, including Ameilia, called Parentalia. Everything we know today about Aemilia and her family comes from Parentalia. His poem about his aunt described her as a "dedicated virgin", who rejected marriage in order to further her career. He described her as "trained in the medical arts as well as any man." He called her an honest and skilled physician, who also assisted her physician brother in his own studies.

In popular culture

Aemilia is a featured figure on Judy Chicago's installation piece The Dinner Party, being represented as one of the 999 names on the Heritage Floor.

References

Bibliography

300s births
360s deaths
4th-century Gallo-Roman people
4th-century Roman women
4th-century women writers
4th-century writers
Ancient gynaecologists
Ancient women physicians
Year of birth uncertain
Hilaria
4th-century Roman physicians
People from Moselle (department)